Pszeniczna  (German Nauke) is a village in the administrative district of Gmina Wilków, within Namysłów County, Opole Voivodeship, in south-western Poland.

The village has a population of 247.

References

Pszeniczna